Edo College is a secondary grammar school in Benin City, Nigeria, the oldest in the Mid-Western Region. It was established in February, 1937 and started as the Benin Middle School with forms, I, II and III. In April 1937, the school, with a total student enrollment of 76 pupils, moved from its temporary site at the old Government School, Benin City to a permanent site, the present Idia College premises. In 1973, the school further moved from Idia College premises to its present site along Murtala Mohammed Way, Benin City. Edo state in the federal Republic of Nigeria.

With the Government take-over of schools in the state in 1973, the management of the College went from the direct control of the Ministry of Education to the Board of Education with particular reference to the appointment and deployment to staff to the school.

Curriculum
Edo College has undergone many evolutionary changes in its educational structure. It had initially began as a day school, then boarding school for boys only but reverted to day school in the 1980s. In the mid-1990s it briefly had a dichotomous structure, day and evening school. Recently following donations from its most successful alumni it is now moving towards boarding school with a total student population of 800 and an average tuition of 60,000 Naira.

Subjects taught include:

 English language 
French
Edo Language, 
Geography/History, 
English Literature, 
Business Studies, 
Home Economics/Food & Nutrition, 
Religious Studies,
Physics,
Chemistry, 
Biology, 
Agricultural Science, 
Computer Science/ICT
Mathematics, 
 
Others includes, Additional Mathematics (pre-calculus), Art & Design, Music, Introductory Technology, Design Technology, Performing Arts, and Physical Education.

All these subjects are carefully woven throughout the 3-3 format of the Nigerian secondary school system. That is 3 years of Junior Secondary School and 3 years of Senior secondary school. A pre-undergraduate level the Higher School Certificate (HSC) /Advanced School Certificate (A-level) are being reintroduced.

Notable alumni

Ewuare II, current Oba of Benin
Arthur Okowa Ifeanyi, Governor of Delta State
Tom Ilube, Founder and CEO of Crossword Cybersecurity
Chris Okotie, President of the Fresh Democratic Party
Lucky Igbinedion, Former Two-Time Governor, Edo State
James Ibori, Former Two-Time Governor, Delta State

References 

https://edocollegebenin.com

External links 
 edocollege
 ecobaportal

Secondary schools in Edo State
Educational institutions established in 1937
Education in Benin City
1937 establishments in Nigeria